Lucifer is a 2019 Nigeria Action Film about a man feared in the community. It was directed by Tope Adebayo and Ibrahim Yekini. Itele also known as Ibrahim Yekini is the producer.

Cast 
Ibrahim Yekini
Temitope Solaja
Adisa Yusuf
Taofeek Muyiba Adekemi
Femi Adebayo
Bimpe Oyebade
Bimbo Akintola
Oshiko Twins
Bukunmi Oluwashina
Kelvin Ikeduba
Tunde Usman
Antar Laniyan
Oluwakemi Adejoro Ojo

Awards 
Ibrahim Yekini got the  BEST Yoruba Actor of at BON AWARD 2020 for the film (Lucifer)

References 

2019 films
Yoruba-language films
Nigerian action films